Dan McGirt is an American author of comic fantasy. His current books consist of the Jason Cosmo series, which was rebooted in 2009 with the publication of Hero Wanted. The Original Jason Cosmo Non-Trilogy was envisioned as an ongoing series, but was discontinued by the publisher after Dirty Work. He is a member of Science Fiction and Fantasy Writers of America (SFWA) and Novelists, Inc (NINC).

Bibliography

Short stories
 Sarah Palin: Vampire Hunter
 Beginner’s Luck
 Jack Scarlet: Bullets for Breakfast
 Jack Scarlet: A Cold, Cold Place to Die

Series

The Original Jason Cosmo Non-Trilogy
 Jason Cosmo (1989)
 Royal Chaos  (1990)
 Dirty Work (1993)

Jason Cosmo
 Hero Wanted (2009) - a rewrite of Jason Cosmo (1989)
 Noble Cause (2012)
 Royal Crush (2015) - an update of Royal Chaos (1990)

 Shortfiction: Rainy Daze (2009) - available at Smashwords

Novels
 Magicka: The Ninth Element (2013)

References

External links
Dan McGirt Homepage 
Jason Cosmo Homepage 

Dan McGirt's page on Smashwords 
Dan McGirt's Facebook page 

20th-century American novelists
21st-century American novelists
American fantasy writers
American male novelists
Living people
1967 births
Novelists from Georgia (U.S. state)
American male short story writers
20th-century American short story writers
21st-century American short story writers
20th-century American male writers
21st-century American male writers